John Briggs House is a historic home located at Milo Center in Yates County, New York. It is a Federal style structure built about 1795.

It was listed on the National Register of Historic Places in 1994.

References

Houses on the National Register of Historic Places in New York (state)
Federal architecture in New York (state)
Houses completed in 1795
Houses in Yates County, New York
National Register of Historic Places in Yates County, New York